Coleophora kaszabi is a moth of the family Coleophoridae. It is found in Mongolia.

The larvae feed on Caragana pygmaea and Caragana bungei. They feed on the leaves of their host plant.

References

kaszabi
Moths of Asia
Moths described in 1974